USS Aludra (AK-72) was a  in the service of the US Navy in World War II. Named after the star Aludra in the constellation Canis Major, it was the first ship of the Navy to bear this name.

Construction
Aludra was laid down 28 October 1942, as liberty ship SS Robert T. Lincoln under a Maritime Commission (MARCOM) contract, MC hull 437, by Permanente Metals Corporation, Yard No. 2, Richmond, California; launched on 7 December 1942; sponsored by Mrs. Dorothy A. Rainbow; renamed Aludra on 30 October 1942; delivered to the Navy on 14 December 1942; and placed in commission at San Francisco, California, on 26 December 1942.

Service history
The new cargo ship joined the Pacific Fleet and held brief shakedown training before departing the west coast on 7 January 1943. She anchored in Dumbea Bay, New Caledonia, on 29 January. The vessel got underway on 2 February for Havannah Harbor, Efate Island, and arrived there two days later. Aludra continued on to Espiritu Santo, where she remained from 11 February through 6 May.

The two ships reached Brisbane, Australia, on 11 May and took on cargo. Aludra sailed on 17 May for Auckland, New Zealand. She arrived there on 23 May and spent one week in port taking on supplies and equipment. The ship left Auckland on 30 May but returned that same day to repair a steering casualty. She got underway again on 31 May.

Sinking
Aludra made port calls at Nouméa, New Caledonia, and Guadalcanal. She departed the latter port on 22 June, bound for Espiritu Santo. At 04:44 on 23 June, a torpedo fired by Japanese submarine  (Ro-100-class submarine) hit Aludras port side and exploded. Two of her crew members were killed and 12 were wounded.

Awards
Aludra earned one battle star for her World War II service.

References

Bibliography

External links

 

 

 

Crater-class cargo ships
World War II auxiliary ships of the United States
Ships sunk by Japanese submarines
World War II shipwrecks in the Pacific Ocean
Ships built in Richmond, California
1942 ships
Maritime incidents in June 1943